Stephen James Young Scott (born 25 September 1961) is a British journalist and presenter employed by ITN as the sports editor and newscaster for ITV News. In 2021 he was named both broadcast journalist of the year and sports news reporter of the year at the annual Sports Journalists' Association Awards.

Television career
Scott began his television career with The West Tonight on ITV West, joining as Industrial Correspondent from local radio station GWR, where he was the news editor and presenter. He joined the ITN produced ITV News in 1993 as the North of England correspondent based in Leeds and West of England correspondent in Bristol. Among stories that Scott covered for ITV News during the 1990s included the Fred and Rose West murders. Scott was part of the reporting teams that covered the Dunblane school massacre and Diana's death. In 1995 he was appointed the Africa Correspondent based in Johannesburg, reporting from many troublespots including Rwanda, Congo (then Zaire) and Zimbabwe.

In 1997 moved to 5 News on Channel 5 as the sports presenter. During that time he fronted more than 100 live European football matches involving British teams. He presented several England international fixtures. He also anchored Moto GP and Rugby Premiership programmes as well as having his own chat show Talk Sport with Steve Scott.

From January 2002 he would present various programmes for BBC Radio 5 Live on a freelance until December 2007. 

Between January 2004 and December 2005 Scott presented the ITV News Channel with Felicity Barr, broadcasting on the late afternoon news on weekdays as well as providing an evening service alternating between the two presenters. During this period he presented the sports segment of the ITV News at 10.30, alternating with Barr. 

Since 2005, Scott has been a regular presenter of the ITV Lunchtime News, ITV Evening News and ITV News weekend bulletins on ITV. He was at the forefront of ITV's extended live programming in the aftermath of the terror attacks on the capital. During that time he also undertook foreign assignments, including Bosnia during the war there and to the United States, where he covered as Washington correspondent on several occasions.

From February 2006, Scott co-presented the main regional news programme The West Tonight on ITV West. Three years later this programme would merge with Westcountry Live on ITV Westcountry. Scott was retained and presented The West Country Tonight for ITV West Country. He presented his last programme on 7 May 2010. In January 2008, ITV launched a late-night documentary series, Nightwatch with Steve Scott. In accordance with its variations, the programme follows the work of the emergency services and army and analyses mysterious events.

As of 10 May 2010, Scott has been the sports editor for ITV News and has reported the bid for the 2012 Summer Olympics to London. He has acted as a weekly columnist for the Bristol Evening Post.

In 2021 he was named both Broadcast Journalist of the Year and Sports News Reporter of the Year at the annual Sports Journalists' Association Awards.

Film
He appeared in the 2013 film Thor: The Dark World as himself, the news presenter for ITV. He also had a role in The Brothers Grimsby. On TV he has appeared in Unforgotten. and Appropriate Adult

Personal life 
Scott was born in Stroud, Gloucestershire. He is married to former presenter Patricia Yorston and they have two children.  He is the brother of former Setanta presenter Angus Scott. He is a Bristol City supporter.

Filmography

References

External links

Steve Scott on Linked In

1961 births
ITN newsreaders and journalists
ITV regional newsreaders and journalists
Living people
People educated at Clifton College
People from Stroud